Mama I Want To Sing! is a 1983 musical based on the life and times of African-American singer Doris Troy.

Production
As a tribute to many of the African-American stars' rise to fame in the 1960 and 1970s, Vy Higginsen based her musical on the life of her sister Doris Troy. Troy's 1963 hit "Just One Look" launched her to international fame and a successful career in London, although her roots were in her church choir. This is not unlike the rise of other R&B and jazz singers such as Aretha Franklin, Patti LaBelle and Donna Summer. Vy Higginsen and Ken Wydro, her husband, conceived the play in January 1979 and subsequently wrote the book and lyrics. The musical, however, was rejected by every major producer in New York. The lack of interest was largely due to the doubtfulness that a large enough audience would be attracted to a gospel-based production. The couple persisted without a producer, and invested their life-savings to hire out the 632-seat Heckscher Theatre in East Harlem, which had previously been closed for 15 years. Vy envisioned her audience as being "senior citizens, church groups, school children, and hard-working black mothers and fathers who had spiritual values and loved soul-stirring music."

Mama, I Want to Sing! opened on March 23, 1983, on a very tight budget; however, word of mouth throughout the black community spread the news about the work. Audiences flocked to see the musical, which "presented the passion, spontaneity and emotional uplift of the black church experience along with a universal message for anyone with a dream." Currently, Mama, I Want to Sing! has played 2,500 performances in New York and another 1,000 performances throughout the United States, Europe, and Japan. It has been performed in front of thousands of people, and is the longest running black off-Broadway musical in American history. On January 7, 1985, Time magazine named Mama, I Want to Sing! one of the ten "Best of '84" theater performances. On January 20, 1986, the show hit its 1000th performance milestone. On February 1–6, 1994, Mama, I Want to Sing! played to 40,000 at the Paramount Theater at Madison Square Garden. In 2003–04, Mama, I Want to Sing! celebrated its 20th anniversary at the Williams Institute C.M.E. Baptist Church in Harlem, formerly the Lafayette Theater. 2011 saw the release of the long-awaited premiere of the film adaptation of the musical by 20th Century Fox.

The Encyclopedia of Popular Music noted that, within four years of its 1983 debut, the musical drew an audience of more than 3million spectators and had grossed £38million, equivalent to more than  adjusted for inflation.

Cast and crew
Various actors and actresses have played the roles of the different parts over the years:

Doris Winter
Crystal Johnson (singer) 1983
Tisha Campbell 1983
Desiree Coleman 1983-85
Lynda McConnell 1984
Octavia Lambertis 1984
Hedreich Guillory 1985-86
D. K. Dyson 1985
Catina Boswell (Auditioned)1986
D'atra Hicks 1986-90
Ramona Keller 1985-88
Adrienne Brand 1986-90
Noreen Crayton 1985-90
Sharlene Nelson 1989
Stacy Francis 1992-96
Lisa Fischer 1996-97
Kim Summerson 1994
Ahmaya Knoelle 2004–present

Musical Director
Wesley Naylor
Rudolph Hawkins
Steve Taylor
Kevin Mckoy
Gregory Kelly 2003– Present
James I. Johnson

Mama Winter
Queen Esther Marrow 1983–84
Doris Troy 1984-2000
Betina Pennon-Dowtin 2011
Dejahnee Richardson 1992–93
Shirley Caesar 1994–96
LeJuene Thompson 2004

Minister of Music
Steven Williams 1983–85
Charles Stewart 1985–90
Pierre Cook 1990-2000
Dejahnee Richardson 1998-2000
Darryl JoVan 2004
Elijah Ahmad Lewis 2011–present

Reverend Winter
Randy Higginson 1983-1988
Alexander Plummer, Jr. 1984–88, 2004
Ronald Grant 1989
Tyrone Flowers 1992–96
Craig Wiggins 1995-2004
Tyrone Flowers 2011

Sister Carrie
Peggie Blue 1983
Carolyn Dennis 1983–84
Trina Thomas 1985
Kathleen Murphy-Jackson 1986-2004
Kellie Evans 1986–88
Altrinna Grayson 1986–88
Dejahnee Richardson 1993–95
Chaka Khan 1995
Deniece Williams 1996
Sandra Huff 2011

Stage Manager
Troy Naquan Busby 2011
Otis White 1986-1989
Marlon Campbell 1993-2004

Key Makeup Artist
Orlané "Starr" Benau 2011

Wardrobe Mistress (crew member)
Theresa Morris 1984-2003
Theda Dennis 2011–present

Lighting Designer
Sandra Ross
Earl

Production Electrician
Marvin Watkins 1984–85
Antoinette Tynes  1985–88

Sound Engineer
Brian Young 1985–87
Don Juan Holder 1986–89

Stage Crew
Freeman Hawes
Frank Hawes
Melody Beal

Musicians
Rudolph Hawkins
Wesley Naylor
Fred Wells (Guitar)
Barry Vincent (Guitar) 1985-86
Al McDowell (Bass)
Gregory Kelly (keys 1 & 2)
Justin Lesley (Drums) 2003-11
Kevin McKoy (keys 1 & 2)
David McKoy (Drums) 2011
Andre Cleghorn (Bass) 2000-13
Evan Rainey (Bass) 2009-11
Al Carty (Bass) 2003-05
Robert Bennix (keys 2) 2003-05
James I. Johnson (Keys) 1986-91 (Road Tour & Home)

Sequels/adaptions

Mama, I Want to Sing: Part II
Mama, I Want to Sing: Part II follows the courtship, marriage, and birth of the first child of superstar Doris Winter and her husband, Rev. Julian Simmons. In the spring of 1990, Mama, I Want to Sing, Part II opened at the Heckscher Theatre playing in repertory with the original play.

The musical was given an overall positive review from Stephen Holden of The New York Times, saying: "The sequel's romance lends the sequel a warmth and sexiness that the original show lacked." Although the review continued to say, "The dialogue and line readings sometimes go completely flat." Holden added: "But in an odd way, the show's weaknesses seem inseparable from its strengths." He concluded by saying, "To attend either production of Mama with a typical audience made up largely of church groups, some of which have traveled hundreds of miles by chartered bus to be there, is to be indelibly reminded of the enduring power of that tradition."

Born to Sing
Born to Sing, the finale to the trilogy reveals the behind–the-scenes activities of Doris Winter's international tour along with her 15-year-old daughter.

Mama, I Want to Sing, The Whole Story
In the autumn of 1992, Mama, I Want to Sing, The Whole Story, a combination show featuring the storylines and music from both the shows, premiered in a 10-week tour in Japan.

Mama, I Want to Sing: The Movie
The 2011 adaptation of Mama, I Want to Sing! is inspired by the stage play and features brand new music. The story revolves around Amara Winter who enters the pop music scene, causing conflict with her mother. She learns to pursue her dreams while both navigating the often treacherous celebrity world and trying to remain true to herself and her family. The film stars Ciara, Lynn Whitfield, Patti LaBelle, Billy Zane, Juanita Bynum, Hill Harper, and Vy and Ken's daughter, Ahmaya Knoelle. Vy Higginsen plays herself in a cameo role.

References

1983 musicals
Off-Broadway musicals
Plays set in the United States
Plays set in New York City